The Annual Indonesian Movie Actor Awards (formerly Indonesian Movie Awards) are annual awards that have been presented to filmmakers in Indonesia since 2007. The trophy given is called Piala Layar Emas. Winners in "Best" categories are selected by a jury, and winners in "Favorite" categories are selected by the public.

Most nominated
Until now,  7 Hati 7 Cinta 7 Wanita is the only film that has been nominated more than 15 times, which is 16 times.
Following behind is  Arisan! 2 with 12 nominations and also there are four films with 11 nominations. Below are the films which has had a total number of nominations of 6 and above.

 Sixteen: 7 Hati 7 Cinta 7 Wanita
 Twelve: Arisan! 2
 Eleven: Berbagi Suami, 3 Hati Dua Dunia, Satu Cinta, Alangkah Lucunya (Negeri Ini), & Minggu Pagi di Victoria Park
 Ten: Laskar Pelangi, Perempuan Berkalung Sorban & Sang Penari
 Night: Mendadak Dangdut, Jermal, Ketika Cinta Bertasbih & Dua Garis Biru
 Eight: Radit dan Jani & Dilema
 Seven: Detik Terakhir, Mengejar Mas-Mas, Quickie Express, Queen Bee, Catatan (Harian) Si Boy & Pengejar Angin
 Six: D'Bijis, Janji Joni, Ruang, Tentang Dia, Get Married, Mereka Bilang, Saya Monyet!, Otomatis Romantis, Kawin Kontrak Lagi, Love, Hari Untuk Amanda, Lovely Man, & Tendangan dari Langit

Most awards
The only film that received a total number of awards above five is Suddenly Dangdut. 
Here are the films that have received at least three awards (films are sorted by year of release and alphabetically).

 Six: Mendadak Dangdut
 Five: Laskar Pelangi, Perempuan Berkalung Sorban and Dua Garis Biru
 Four: 7 Hati 7 Cinta 7 Wanita and Minggu Pagi di Victoria Park
 Three: Radit dan Jani, Ketika Cinta Bertasbih, Dilema and Sang Penari

Awards ceremony

References

External links
 Official website

 
Indonesian film awards
Awards established in 2007
2007 establishments in Indonesia
Annual events in Indonesia
Recurring events established in 2007
RCTI original programming